These are the results of 2021 BWF World Senior Championships' 75+ events. Due to the only one entry, the women's doubles event remain cancelled.

Men's singles 

 Paweł Gasz (silver medalist)
 Matthias Kiefer (bronze medalist)
 Ian Brothers (quarter-finals)
 Knut Sverre Liland (second round)

Finals

Top half

Section 1

Section 2

Top half

Section 3

Section 4

Women's singles

Seed 

 Elvira Richter (silver medalist)

Draw

Men's doubles

Seeds 

 Paweł Gasz / Czesław Gwiazda (bronze medalists)
 Ian Brothers / Ray Sharp (gold medalists)

Group A

Group B

Finals

Mixed doubles

Seeds 

 Paweł Gasz /  Beryl Goodall (withdrew)
 Heini Johannesen / Maria Caridad Romero (group stage)

Group A

Group B

Finals

References 
Men's singles
Women's singles
Men's doubles
Mixed doubles

2021 BWF World Senior Championships